Kevin Krawietz and Andreas Mies were the defending champions but this year they decided to participate in the Cologne event instead.

John Peers and Michael Venus won the title, defeating Rohan Bopanna and Matwé Middelkoop in the final, 6–3, 6–4.

Seeds

Draw

References

External links
 Main Draw

European Open - Doubles
2020 Doubles